Cao Diqiu (Wade–Giles Ts'ao Ti-ch'iu)  (August 1, 1909 – March 29, 1976) was a People's Republic of China politician. He was born in Ziyang, Sichuan Province. He joined the Chinese Communist Party in 1929. After graduating from Sichuan University, he went to northern Jiangsu Province after the outbreak of the Second Sino-Japanese War to participate in guerrilla activities. He was the third mayor of Shanghai under the People's Republic of China until being deposed on January 6, 1967, in the wake of the "January Storm" phase of the Cultural Revolution. He was also Chinese Communist Party Committee Secretary and Mayor of Chongqing.

References

1909 births
1976 deaths
People's Republic of China politicians from Sichuan
Chinese Communist Party politicians from Sichuan
Mayors of Shanghai
Mayors of Chongqing
Political office-holders in Chongqing
Victims of the Cultural Revolution
Politicians from Ziyang
Sichuan University alumni